The 3rd Armoured Division is a unit of the French Army formed during World War II that took part in the May-June 1940 Battle of France.

History 
Formed 20 March 1940 at Reims. Campaigns: Battle of the Meuse, Meuse Front, Battle of the Aisne and Retreat of the Center. Final command post at Montbard northwest of Dijon. Division captured 17–18 June. Subordination: XXI Corps of 2nd Army until 23 May, then various including 4th Army and XVIII Corps of 2nd Army.

Composition 
In May 1940:
 41st Tank Battalion (B1 bis tanks)
 49th Tank Battalion (B1 bis tanks)
 42nd Tank Battalion (H39 tanks)
 45th Tank Battalion (H39 tanks)
 16th Motorized Rifle Battalion (bataillon de chasseurs portés)
 319th Artillery Regiment

References

Bibliography 

 (GUF) Service Historique de l'Armée de Terre. Guerre 1939–1945 Les Grandes Unités Françaises. Paris: Imprimerie Nationale, 1967.

French World War II divisions
Armored divisions of France
Military units and formations established in 1940
Military units and formations disestablished in 1940